Tony de la Guardia (born Antonio de la Guardia y Font in 1939 in Havana, Cuba - 1989 in Havana, Cuba) was a Colonel in the Cuban Ministry of Interior. He worked in Fidel Castro's administration, and in 1989 was executed, convicted of cocaine trafficking.

He was the son of Mario de Guardia y Curbelo and Graziella Font. He had an older brother, Mario and a twin brother, Patricio de la Guardia y Font who was sentenced to 30 years of prison in 1989, eventually being released in July 2019.

References

Cuban spies
De la Guardia, Tony
Executed Cuban people
Cuban drug traffickers
People executed for drug offences
20th-century executions by Cuba
1939 births
1989 deaths
People from Havana
People executed by Cuba by firing squad